The XXXI Golden Grand Prix Ivan Yarygin 2020, also known as Ivan Yarygin (Yariguin) 2020 is a United World Wrestling rankings freestyle wrestling international tournament, which was held in Krasnoyarsk, Russia between 23 and 26 January 2020.

Medal overview

Medal table

Men's freestyle

Women's freestyle

Participating nations
365 competitors from 13 nations participated.

 (3)
 (8)
 (8)
 (1)
 (1)
 (1)
 (44)
 (3)
 (83)
 (203)
 (1)
 (3)
 (6)

References

External links 

Golden Grand Prix Ivan Yarygin
Golden Grand Prix Ivan Yarygin
2020 in sport wrestling
January 2020 sports events in Russia